The Harry Smith House is a Queen Anne-style frame dwelling, built in 1890.  It stands on one of the original streets platted in the 1889 railroad suburb subdivision of Riverdale Park, Prince George's County, Maryland located northeast of Washington, D.C. The home is representative of the transition in domestic architecture between the Queen Anne style of the 1880s and the popular plan of the turn of the 20th century. Its owners were a middle class, government worker family, the Smiths, who owned it from the time when the developer sold it until the middle of the 20th century.

It was listed on the National Register of Historic Places in 1993.

References

External links
, including photo in 1992, at Maryland Historical Trust website

Houses completed in 1890
Houses in Prince George's County, Maryland
Queen Anne architecture in Maryland
Houses on the National Register of Historic Places in Maryland
Historic American Buildings Survey in Maryland
National Register of Historic Places in Prince George's County, Maryland
1890 establishments in Maryland